Black October may refer to:

 The October 1993 attack by the Yeltsin administration on pro-Soviet mass demonstrations.
The riots that took place October 1988, in Algeria
 The October Crisis, a 1970 kidnapping/terrorism crisis in Canada
 Black October (film), a 2000 film about the October Crisis
 Black October (album), 2006 Sadat X album
 "Octubre negro", unrest in Bolivia in October 2003 during the Bolivian gas conflict
 October 2008, the onset of the global financial crisis of 2008
 2013 New South Wales bushfires in Australia